Farren Blackburn is a British film and television director and screenwriter. His work includes Netflix's young adult love story, The Innocents, the French English-language psychological thriller Shut In starring Naomi Watts, Netflix/Marvel's Daredevil, Iron Fist and The Defenders.

Early career
As a young man he was on the books of Cambridge United Football Club and represented England at youth level. he went to the secondary school sir William Robertson comp in welbourn Lincolnshire .lived in a small village called caythorpe .

Career

He directed The Fades for which he received a BAFTA for best Drama Series. He also directed the Golden Globe nominated crime series Luther, the movie Hammer of the Gods, BBC period drama The Musketeers and the Doctor Who episodes "The Rings of Akhaten" and the 2011 Christmas special, "The Doctor, The Widow and the Wardrobe". He directed Naomi Watts in the French English-language psychological thriller Shut In (2016), from Christina Hodson's Blacklist screenplay about a woman who discovers a shocking secret about her catatonic son. In June 2019 he announced via Twitter that he will direct 5 episodes of season 2 of A Discovery of Witches.

In years previous, he was also a regular director of BBC medical drama Holby City.

Awards
He won a BAFTA for best Drama Series for The Fades.

Family life
He is married to actress Verona Joseph and has two daughters and a son: Elsie-Mae Blackburn, Ruby-Rose Blackburn and Terrell Blackburn.

Filmography
The Fades (2011)
Doctor Who
 "The Doctor, the Widow and the Wardrobe" (2011, Christmas Special)
 "The Rings of Akhaten" (2013, Series 7 Episode 8)
Hammer of the Gods (2013)
 The Musketeers
 "The Challenge" (2014)
 "Musketeers Don't Die Easily" (2014)
Daredevil (2015, Series 1)
 "World on Fire", Episode 5
 "Nelson vs Murdock", Episode 10
Shut In (2016)
Iron Fist
"Felling Tree with Roots", Episode 7 (2017, Series 1)
The Defenders
"The Defenders", Episode 8 (2017, Series 1)
The Innocents (2018)
A Discovery Of Witches Season 2 (TV Series) (2021)

References

External links
 

Living people
Year of birth missing (living people)
British television directors
British film directors
British male screenwriters